During the 1988–89 English football season, Leicester City F.C. competed in the Football League Second Division.

Season summary
In the 1988–89 season, Leicester failed to put consecutive wins in the league for the first time since the 1977–78 relegation season from the top flight. The only highlight in the league for the Foxes was a 2-0 win over champions Chelsea which delayed their promotion celebrations and also ending their 27 match unbeaten run. Leicester's 15th-place finish meant the Foxes finished in the bottom half of the Second Division for a second season running, which they hadn't done since 1951.

Final league table

Results
Leicester City's score comes first

Legend

Football League Second Division

FA Cup

League Cup

Full Members Cup

Squad

References

Leicester City F.C. seasons
Leicester City